Hauā is a Wharenui of New Zealand. The name may be short for:

Te Iti a Hauā
Ngāti Hauā

See also
Haua, companion of the creator god Makemake of Easter Island